Gartly is a locality in Alberta, Canada.

The community takes its name from Gartly, in Scotland.

References 

Localities in Starland County